Cobb Creek may refer to:

Cobb Creek (Lac qui Parle River), a stream in Minnesota and South Dakota
Cobb Creek (Missouri), a stream in Missouri
Cobb Creek (Oklahoma), a tributary of the Washita River in Washita County, Oklahoma

See also
Cobbs Creek